The Sousse Olympic Indoor Sports Hall is an indoor sporting arena located in Sousse, Tunisia. The Hall is the Home of the Étoile Sportive du Sahel commons sections including Handball, Basketball, Volleyball The capacity of the arena is 5,000 spectators.

Events
The Sousse Olympic Hall is used for many Sports disciplines like Volleyball, Basketball, Handball, Martial Arts and also the Complex is a host for many politics and cultural Events.

The Sousse Hall was built specifically for the Étoile Sportive du Sahel to host all club's sections, So the hall hosted continental events such as Africans volleyball Club competitions, African handball club competitions and African Basketball club competitions.

The Olympic Hall also contributed to hosting Tunisia for the most important international competitions for national teams, as it was among the halls that hosted the 2005 World Men's Handball Championship, in addition to Tunisia hosting the 2013 Men's African Volleyball Championship through the Sousse Indoor Sports Hall.

References

Indoor arenas in Tunisia
1987 establishments in Tunisia
Sports venues completed in 1987
Volleyball venues in Tunisia
Basketball venues in Tunisia
Handball venues in Tunisia